Prince Stepan may refer to:

 Stepan Khilkov (1785–1854), Russian lieutenant-general, eldest son of Prince Alexander Jacobovich Khilkoff
 Prince Stepan Arkadyevitch Oblonsky, character in the novel Anna Karenina
 Prince Stepan Kasatsky, character in the short story "Father Sergius"

See also
Stefan (disambiguation)
Stephan (disambiguation)